The Pembrokeshire Motor Museum used to exhibit a range of restored vintage cars. The museum displayed over 40 vehicles covering the history of the motor car.

The privately owned museum included displays of model vehicles, motorcycles, bicycles, signs and other ephemera, a dining area and bar, video and magazine lounge and a play area for young people.

External links
Official site

Automobile museums in Wales
Museums in Pembrokeshire